In functional analysis and related areas of mathematics an absorbing set in a vector space is a set  which can be "inflated" or "scaled up" to eventually always include any given point of the vector space. 
Alternative terms are radial or absorbent set. 
Every neighborhood of the origin in every topological vector space is an absorbing subset.

Definition

Notation for scalars

Suppose that  is a vector space over the field  of real numbers  or complex numbers  and for any  let 

denote the open ball (respectively, the closed ball) of radius  in  centered at   

Preliminaries

Balanced core and balanced hull

The balanced hull and core always exist and are unique. 
They are given by the formulas 

A set  is balanced if and only if it is equal to its balanced hull or to its balanced core, in which case all three of these sets are equal: 

If  is any scalar then 
 
and if  is non-zero or if  then also

One set absorbing another

 Definition: There exists a real  such that  for every scalar  satisfying  Or stated more succinctly,  for some 
 This definition depends on the underlying scalar field's canonical norm (that is, on the absolute value ), which thus ties this definition to the usual Euclidean topology on the scalar field. Consequently, the definition of an absorbing set (given below) is also tied to this topology. 
 There exists a real  such that  for every non-zero scalar  satisfying  Or stated more succinctly,  for some 
 Because this union is equal to  where  is the closed ball with the origin removed, this condition may be restated as:  for some 
 The non-strict inequality  can be replaced with the strict inequality  which is the next characterization.
 There exists a real  such that  for every non-zero scalar  satisfying  Or stated more succinctly,  for some 
 Here  is the open ball with the origin removed and  

If  is a balanced set then this list can be extended to include:
There exists a non-zero scalar  such that 
 If  then the requirement  may be dropped.
 There exists a non-zero scalar  such that 

There exists  such that  for every scalar  satisfying  Or stated more succinctly, 
There exists  such that  for every scalar  satisfying  Or stated more succinctly, 
Because  this may be rewritten  which gives the next statement.
There exists  such that 
There exists  such that 
There exists  such that 
 The next characterizations follow from those above and the fact that for every scalar  the balanced hull of  satisfies  and (since ) its balanced core satisfies  
There exists  such that  In words, a set is absorbed by  if it is contained in some positive scalar multiple of the balanced core of 
There exists  such that 
There exists a scalar  such that  In words,  can be scaled to contain the balanced hull of 
There exists a scalar  such that 
There exists a scalar  such that  In words,  can be scaled so that its balanced core contains 
There exists a scalar  such that 
There exists a non-zero scalar  such that  In words, the balanced core of  contains some non-zero scalar multiple of 

If  or  this list can be extended to include:
 absorbs  (according to any defining condition of "absorbs" other than this one).

A set absorbing a point

A set is said to   if it absorbs the singleton set  A set  absorbs the origin if and only if it contains the origin; that is, if and only if  
As detailed below, a set is said to be  if it absorbs every point of  

This notion of one set absorbing another is also used in other definitions: 
A subset of a topological vector space  is called  if it is absorbed by every neighborhood of the origin. 
A set is called  if it absorbs every bounded subset. 

Examples

Every set absorbs the empty set but the empty set does not absorbs any non-empty set. The singleton set  containing the origin is the one and only singleton subset that absorbs itself. 

Suppose that  is equal to either  or  If  is the unit circle (centered at the origin ) together with the origin, then  is the one and only non-empty set that  absorbs.

Absorbing set

Definition:  absorbs every point of  that is, for every   absorbs 
So in particular,  can not be absorbing if  Every absorbing set must contain the origin.
 absorbs every finite subset of 
For every  there exists a real  such that  for any scalar  satisfying 
For every  there exists a real  such that  for any scalar  satisfying 
For every  there exists a real  such that 
 Here  is the open ball of radius  in the scalar field centered at the origin and 
 The closed ball can be used in place of the open ball.
 Because  the inclusion  holds if and only if  This proves the next statement.
For every  there exists a real  such that  where  
This gives the next characterization.
 The only TVS topologies on a 1-dimensional vector space are the (non-Hausdorff) trivial topology and the Hausdorff Euclidean topology.
Connection to vector/TVS topologies: This condition gives insight as to why every neighborhood of the origin in every topological vector space (TVS) is necessarily absorbing: If  is a neighborhood of the origin in a TVS  then for every 1-dimensional vector subspace   is a neighborhood of the origin in  when  is endowed with the subspace topology induced on it by  This subspace topology is always a vector topology and because  is 1-dimensional, the only vector topologies on it are the Hausdorff Euclidean topology and the trivial topology, which is a subset of the Euclidean topology. 
Thus  is absorbing.
 The reason why the Euclidean topology is distinguished in this characterization ultimately stems from the defining requirement on TVS topologies that scalar multiplication  be continuous when the scalar field  is given this (Euclidean) topology.
 Here "absorbing" means absorbing according to any defining condition other than this one.

If  then to this list can be appended:
The algebraic interior of  contains the origin (that is).

If  is balanced then to this list can be appended:
 For every  there exists a scalar  such that  (or equivalently, such that ).
 For every  there exists a scalar  such that 

If  is convex or balanced then to this list can be appended:
 For every  there exists a positive real  such that 
A detailed proof is given in this footnote and a summary is given below.

Give  its unique Hausdorff vector topology so it remains to show that  is a neighborhood of the origin in  If  then we are done, so assume that  The set  is a union of two intervals, each of which contains an open sub-interval that contains the origin; moreover, the intersection of these two intervals is precisely the origin.
For every  there exists a positive real  such that 
 This condition is equivalent to: every  belongs to the set  This happens if and only if  which gives the next characterization.
 
It can be shown that for any subset  of   if and only if  for every  where 
 For every   

Examples and sufficient conditions

For one set to absorb another

Let  be a linear map between vector spaces and let  and  be balanced sets. Then  absorbs  if and only if  absorbs  

If a set  absorbs another set  then any superset of  also absorbs  
A set  absorbs the origin if and only if the origin is an element of  

A set  absorbs a finite union  of sets if and only it absorbs each set individuality (that is, if and only if  absorbs  for every ). In particular, a set  is an absorbing subset of  if and only if it absorbs every finite subset of

For a set to be absorbing

In a semi normed vector space the unit ball is absorbing. 

If  is a disk (convex and balanced) then  so that in particular,  is an absorbing subset of  
Thus if  is a disk in  then  is absorbing in  if and only if  

Any superset of an absorbing set is absorbing. Thus the union of any family of (one or more) absorbing sets is absorbing. 
The image of an absorbing set under a surjective linear operator is again absorbing. The inverse image of an absorbing subset (of the codomain) under a linear operator is again absorbing (in the domain). 
The intersection of a finite family of (one or more) absorbing sets is absorbing. If  absorbing then the same is true of the symmetric set  

Auxiliary normed spaces

This guarantees that the Minkowski functional  of  will be a seminorm on  thereby making  into a seminormed space that carries its canonical pseduometrizable topology. If  is a topological vector space and if this convex absorbing subset  is also a bounded subset of  then the same will be true of the absorbing disk  in which case  will be a norm and  will form what is known as an auxiliary normed space.

Properties

Every absorbing set contains the origin. 
If  is an absorbing disk in a vector space  then there exists an absorbing disk  in  such that 

See also

Notes

Proofs

Citations

References

  
  
 
  
  
  
  
  
  
  
  
  
  
  
  
  
  
  
  
  
  
 
  
 
 
  
  
  
  
  
  
  

Functional analysis